During the 2008–09 season Anderlecht competed in the Belgian First Division, Belgian Cup, and Champions League. Anderlecht competed in the Belgian Super Cup as cup-winners, but lost to Standard Liège.

After the 34 league matches, they ended with 77 points tied for first place. As Standard Liège had the same number of points and the same number of matches won, test matches were organised to determine the winner. Anderlecht drew 1–1 at home but then lost 1–0 at Standard and thus ended in second position. In the cup they were eliminated in the early rounds by Mechelen, who progressed on to lose the final.

Anderlecht failed to progress past the second qualifying round of UEFA Champions League.

Players

Transfers 2008-09

Players in

Players out

Loaned out

Competitions

Jupiler Pro League

Classification

Results summary

Results by round

Squad statistics

Squad
Appearances for competitive matches only

Note: during the summer transfer window, Kouyaté and Proto are loaned out while Lamah and Pareja were sold. During the winter transfer window, Goor was sold and Kanu was loaned out.

As of game played May 21, 2009

Scorers
Last updated on May 21, 2009.

Per Competition

Per Match
The list of matches is chronological, as presented at the list of competitive matches.

A '-' denotes the player was at that time not on the books of Anderlecht.

Disciplinary record

Competitive Matches

See also
List of R.S.C. Anderlecht seasons

Notes

R.S.C. Anderlecht seasons
Anderlecht